Life's What You Make It is the third album by American R&B singer Wendy Moten.

Overview
Following her success with the album Time for Change, released the previous year, Moten returned to the studio to record her third album. She co-wrote two of the tracks as well as featuring on the production, in addition to her usual vocal duties. The album failed to have any success in her native US but its title track was another smash hit when released as a single in Japan, reaching number 1.

Reception
AllMusic's Alex Henderson gave the album 2 stars out of 5, and called the album "a generally respectable, if slightly uneven, sophomore outing for the Memphis singer".

Track listing

Production
Produced By Curtis Mathewson, Wendy Moten, Alfredo Scotti, Mindy Jostyn, Dick Williams
Engineers: Steve Capp, Gary Harwood, Grant Mohrman, Curtis Mathewson, Will Schillinger, Robert Tassi
Assistant Engineers: Todd Fairall, Anthony Gallagher, Brian Miller, Tim Roberts, David Sealy, Michael Tuller
Mixing: Curtis Mathewson, Grant Mohrman, Dick Williams
Mastering: Bob Ludwig

Personnel
Buster Mayberry: Drums, Percussion
 Ron Otis, Steve Potts, Mario Resto: Drums
 Lawrence Fratangelo: Percussion
 Ray Burton, David Santo, Al Turner: Bass 
Imogen Heap: Keyboards and Keyboard Programming
 Luis Resto: Keyboards and Various Programming
 Curtis Matthewson: Guitars, Various Programming
Anita Cochran, Randy Jacobs, Donnie Lyle, Dominic Miller, Mitchell Stokes: Guitars
 Grant Mohrman: Sitar
Strings: William H. Hollman, Kathlyn Powell, Peter Spurbeck, Adam Stepniewski
Strings Arranged By Luis Resto & Paul Riser
Horns Arranged By Walter White
Backing Vocals: The Ridgeway Sisters

References

2009 albums
Wendy Moten albums
Capitol Records albums